Golden Hour is the fourth studio album by American country music singer and songwriter Kacey Musgraves, released on March 30, 2018, through MCA Nashville. Musgraves co-wrote all 13 tracks and co-produced the album with Daniel Tashian and Ian Fitchuk. A country pop record, Golden Hour also contains elements of disco, electropop, electronica, and yacht rock.

Golden Hour debuted at number four on the US Billboard 200. Receiving widespread critical acclaim, the album and its songs won in all four of their nominated categories at the 61st Grammy Awards, including Album of the Year and Best Country Album. The album's first two singles also won awards: "Butterflies" for Best Country Solo Performance and "Space Cowboy" for Best Country Song. Golden Hour also won Album of the Year at the 52nd Annual Country Music Association Awards. In 2020, Golden Hour was ranked at 270 on Rolling Stone's 500 Greatest Albums of All Time list.

Background and recording
Musgraves wrote and recorded most of the songs from the album throughout 2017. When asked about the writing process, she said, "I have a lot more love songs this time around, and I've never been one to write a love song and really feel it." She continued: "That probably sounds like the most depressing thing ever. [But] I'm coming off getting married and being in this golden hour of my personal life, where all these things are finally coming to fruition. I found myself inspired to write about this person and all these things he brought out in me that weren’t there before." Pieces of the album were recorded in a studio above a horse stable owned by musician Sheryl Crow.

In a 2019 interview with Rolling Stone, Musgraves discussed being under the influence of LSD when composing the songs "Mother" and "Slow Burn" and how it helped her creative process; "I’m not going to tell anybody to run out and do anything that wouldn’t be suitable for their mind or their lifestyle, but it did have positive effects for me."

Promotion and packaging
On March 10, 2018, Musgraves announced the Oh, What a World: Tour in support of the album while performing at the Country to Country music festival in London. The first twelve dates of the tour were announced on March 12, through Musgraves stating on social media that tour dates in other countries would eventually be added. The tour began on October 13 in Oslo, Norway. Musgraves announced a second leg of the tour, titled the "Oh, What a World: Tour II", in February 2019.

Musgraves' sister Kelly Christine Sutton took the cover photo for Golden Hour over a two-day photo shoot in and around their hometown of Golden, Texas. Sutton, who also is credited with designing the album's packaging, has previously worked with Musgraves for all of her albums' artwork. When considering the cover photo, Sutton recalls Kacey "wanted to use this paper fan, and we are usually on the same page with ideas, but I couldn’t picture it. We went out into this wide open field. We needed one with no trees, so there was sky only. Almost immediately after we reviewed the photos, we just knew we had it."

Critical reception

Golden Hour received widespread acclaim from music critics. At Metacritic, which assigns a normalized rating out of 100 to reviews from mainstream critics, the album has an average score of 89, based on 18 reviews, indicating "universal acclaim". Stephen Thomas Erlewine of AllMusic rated the album four and a half out of five stars and called it "warm and enveloping, pitched halfway between heartbreak and healing—but (it) lingers in the mind because the songs are so sharp, buttressed by long, loping melodies and Musgraves' affectless soul baring." Writing for The Independent and rating the album a perfect 5 out of 5, Roisin O'Connor states the album is "a reminder that sometimes – often, if you're looking in the right places – life is beautiful." Additionally, it was a Spin "Essential" and of the genre-bending songs on the album, reviewer Katherine St. Asaph calls it "not classicist, but perhaps it might be classic." The album was rated number one by the BBC poll of polls, a compilation of best-of-the-year lists across 35 music reviewers, on a list of the best albums of 2018. The album also placed number one in The Village Voices Pazz & Jop critics' poll for 2018.

Accolades
At the 61st Annual Grammy Awards in 2019, Golden Hour won Album of the Year and Best Country Album. Its songs, "Space Cowboy" and "Butterflies", won Best Country Song and Best Country Solo Performance, respectively.

Commercial performance
Golden Hour debuted at number four on the US Billboard 200 and at number one on the Top Country Albums chart with 49,000 album-equivalent units, with 39,000 of that figure being pure album sales in its first week. It marks Musgraves’ third number one on the US Top Country Albums chart. It also debuted at number one on the Americana/Folk Albums chart. In the chart week following the 61st Grammy Awards, where Golden Hour won Album of the Year, the album returned to the top ten, climbing to number nine on the chart, selling 35,000 copies. In February 2019, the album has reached 310,000 in album-equivalent units sold. On June 28, 2019, the album was certified gold by the Recording Industry Association of America (RIAA) for combined sales and album-equivalent units of over 500,000 units. As of February 2020, the album has sold 735,000 units in the United States .

In the United Kingdom, Golden Hour debuted at number six on the official UK Albums Chart and at number one on the UK Country Albums chart. It marks Musgraves' first top ten album in the UK.

Track listing
Credits adapted from liner notes.

All tracks are produced by Daniel Tashian, Ian Fitchuk, and Kacey Musgraves.

Personnel
Credits adapted from liner notes.

Instrumentation
Daniel Tashian – keyboards , bass guitar , background vocals , Fender Stratocaster ), electric guitar , baritone guitar , acoustic guitar , celeste , banjo , electric mandolin , programming , vibraphone , MIDI strings , classical guitar , Elektron sampler , Rhodes 
Todd Lombardo – acoustic guitar , electric guitar , banjo , high strung acoustic guitar , baritone guitar , slide guitar , classical guitar 
Ian Fitchuk – drums , keyboards , percussion , bass guitar , Roland Juno-60 , piano , programming , vocoder , banjo , background vocals , Wurlitzer , electric guitar , synth bass 
David Davidson – violin , viola 
Carole Rabinowitz – cello 
Kacey Musgraves – lead vocals , acoustic guitar 
Russ Pahl – pedal steel guitar 
Justin Schipper – pedal steel guitar 
Dan Dugmore – pedal steel guitar 
Shawn Everett – "dolphin magic" 
Kyle Ryan – electric guitar 

Technical
Craig Alvin – recording, mixing 
Alberto Vaz – recording assistance
Zack Pancoast – recording assistance
Shawn Everett – mixing 
Ivan Wayman – mixing assistance 
Şerban Ghenea – mixing 
John Hanes – engineering for mix 
Gena Johnson – production coordination
Bobby Shin – strings recording
Jordan Lehning – editing
Greg Calbi – mastering
Steve Fallone – mastering

Artwork
Kelly Christine Sutton – art direction, photography, design
Kacey Musgraves – art direction

Charts

Weekly charts

Year-end charts

Certifications

Release history

References

2018 albums
Kacey Musgraves albums
Grammy Award for Album of the Year
Grammy Award for Best Country Album
MCA Records albums
Country pop albums
Pop albums by American artists